Medal of Independence may refer to:

Cross of Independence (Krzyż Niepodległości), one of the highest Polish military decorations between World Wars I and II
Fiji Independence Medal
Independence Medal (Lithuania)
Philippine Independence Medal, a Philippine military decoration awarded to military personnel who had participated in World War II
Medal of Independence (Turkey) (İstiklal Madalyası), a Turkish decoration for contributions during the Turkish War of Independence
Medal of Independence (Vietnam), one of the highest Vietnamese decorations since 1947, awarded to Trần Thị Liên
Zimbabwean Independence Medal, 1980